Berkshire Medical Center is a private, non-profit 302-bed community teaching hospital in Pittsfield, Massachusetts affiliated with the University of Massachusetts Medical School.

History
The hospital's history goes back to the original House of Mercy hospital, which opened in Pittsfield in 1875. In 1949 the House of Mercy was renamed Pittsfield General Hospital, and moved into a new seven-level, 245-bed location in 1962. It merged with St. Luke's Hospital in 1968, becoming the Berkshire Medical Center. It merged with Hillcrest Hospital in 1996. It acquired the former North Adams Regional Hospital property from Bankruptcy Court on August 29, 2014.

Certifications
Berkshire is certified by the American College of Surgeons as a Level III trauma center and by The Joint Commission.

See also
Fairview Hospital (Massachusetts)

References

External links

Hospital buildings completed in 1962
Hospitals in Berkshire County, Massachusetts
Buildings and structures in Pittsfield, Massachusetts
Trauma centers